TopWare Interactive – AC Enterprises e.K. is a German video game publisher based in Karlsruhe. The company is best known for publishing the Two Worlds series developed by its Reality Pump Studios division.

History 
TopWare Interactive was started in 1995 as a video game publishing subsidiary of TopWare CD Service AG based in Mannheim, Germany, which included two inhouse development studios (ToonTRAXX and TopWare Programy), which was later renamed to Reality Pump Studios based in Poland. In February 2001, TopWare CD Service AG filed for bankruptcy. All rights, including both development studios, were acquired by Zuxxez Entertainment AG.

The company was resurrected by Zuxxez in 2005. In 2011, Zuxxez officially changed its name back to TopWare Interactive, thus completely abandoning the Zuxxez brand. TopWare Interactive AG's American company, TopWare Interactive Inc., revealed that it was developing Battle vs. Chess to be published by SouthPeak Games. Interplay Entertainment sued and won an injunction to stop sales in the United States. In February 2012, Interplay won the case by default and a settlement was agreed on 15 November 2012. Terms of the settlement were $200,000 plus interest.

TopWare Interactive / Zuxxez Entertainment filed for bankruptcy again on 1 February 2016. While the company has not released any official comment on the subject yet, the insolvency has already been registered in the European Insolvency Register. The filing for bankruptcy comes just a few days after the pulling of Vendetta: Curse of Raven's Cry (the last game published by TopWare Interactive, a re-release of Raven's Cry) from Steam. Nevertheless, TopWare quietly released the game again later.

However, on 26 March 2016, TopWare announced it has begun development of Two Worlds 3 which is set to be released in 2020.

Reality Pump Studios
Reality Pump Studios was founded as an in-house developer for TopWare Interactive in Bielsko-Biała, Poland, in 1995. Their first successful title was Earth 2140. In 2001, they formed a partnership with Zuxxez Entertainment AG and officially took the name 'Reality Pump - Game Development Studios'. They moved their headquarters to Kraków.

In 2015 the company went bankrupt and was acquired by TopWare Interactive.

Published titles

Premium 
 1996: Das Schwarze Auge: Schatten über Riva — MS-DOS
 1997: Jack Orlando — PC
 1997: Earth 2140 — PC
 1998: Emergency
 1998: Knights and Merchants: The Shattered Kingdom
 1999: Excessive Speed
 1999: Gorky 17
 1999: Jagged Alliance 2
 1999: Septerra Core: Legacy of the Creator
 2000: Earth 2150: Escape from the Blue Planet
 2000: Earth 2150: The Moon Project
 2001: Earth 2150: Lost Souls
 2001: World War III: Black Gold
 2002: Enclave
 2001: Chicken Shoot 1
 2002: Knights and Merchants: The Peasants Rebellion
 2002: Heli Heroes
 2002: World War II: Panzer Claws
 2003: Chicken Shoot 2
 2003: KnightShift
 2004: Jagged Alliance 2: Wildfire
 2004: I of the Dragon
 2005: Earth 2160 — PC
 2006: Dream Pinball 3D — PC
 2007: Two Worlds — PC, Xbox 360
 2009: X-Blades — PC, Xbox 360, PlayStation 3
 2010: Two Worlds II — PC, Mac, Xbox 360, PlayStation 3
 2011: Two Worlds 2: Pirates of the Flying Fortress — PC, Mac, Xbox 360, PlayStation 3
 2011: Battle vs Chess aka Check vs. Mate — PC, Mac, Xbox 360, PlayStation 3, Nintendo Wii
 2012: Planets under Attack — PC, Xbox 360, PlayStation 3
 2012: Iron Sky: Invasion — PC, Mac, Xbox 360, PlayStation 3
 2014: Sacrilegium — PC, Mac OS X, Xbox 360, PlayStation 3, Wii U
 2015: Raven's Cry — PC, Mac
 2016: Two Worlds 2: Call of the Tenebrae
 2017: Two Worlds 2: Shadows of the Dark Past
 2018: Two Worlds 2: Shadows of the Dark Past 2
 2019: Two Worlds 2: Shattered Embrace
TBA: Scivelation — PC, Xbox One, PlayStation 4
TBA: Two Worlds 3

Value
 Dream Pinball 3D
 Burn
 BoG Arcade
 BoG Role Playing
 BoG Strategy
 WWIII: Black Gold
 World War II: Panzer Claws II
 Kings of Dark Age
 Septerra Core
 Gorky 17
 Heli Heroes
 Knights & Merchants
 Earth 2140
 Earth 2150
 Earth 2160
 Das Schwarze Auge: Die Schicksalsklinge (1997 re-release)
 Das Schwarze Auge: Sternenschweif (1997 re-release)
 Das Schwarze Auge: Schatten über Riva (1997 re-release)
 EEP Pro 3.0
 Jack Orlando
 X-Blades
 Transcripted
 Gold Games compilation series

References

External links

TopWare Interactive at MobyGames

Companies based in Karlsruhe
German companies established in 1995
Video game companies of Germany
Video game companies established in 1995
Video game publishers
Companies that filed for Chapter 11 bankruptcy in 2001
Companies that filed for Chapter 11 bankruptcy in 2016